Saving Room for Dessert is a crime novel by the American writer K. C. Constantine set in 1990s Rocksburg, a fictional, blue-collar, Rust Belt town in Western Pennsylvania, modeled on the author's hometown of McKees Rocks, Pennsylvania, adjacent to Pittsburgh.

Constantine's earlier novels followed the exploits of police chief Mario Balzic and detective Rugs Carlucci of the Rocksburg police department; this one departs from the pattern by shadowing three beat cops: William Rayford, Robert Canoza, and James Reseta.

It is the seventeenth book in the 17-volume Rocksburg series.

References

2002 American novels
Novels by K. C. Constantine
Pittsburgh in fiction
Novels set in Pennsylvania
American crime novels
Mysterious Press books